Joseph Anthony Robitaille (March 2, 1879 – July 30, 1947), was a Major League Baseball pitcher who played in  and  with the Pittsburgh Pirates. He batted and threw right-handed.

He was born in Whitehall, New York and died in Waterford, New York.

External links

1879 births
1947 deaths
Pittsburgh Pirates players
Major League Baseball pitchers
Baseball players from New York (state)
Troy Washerwomen players
Troy Trojans (minor league) players
Columbus Senators players
Birmingham Barons players
Utica Utes players
Binghamton Bingoes players
Bridgeport Crossmen players
Plattsburgh (baseball) players
Burials in Saratoga County, New York